Otto Abel (24 October 1905 – 21 September 1977) was a German organist, Kantor, composer, Verlagslektor und evangelischer .

Life 
Born in Berlin, von 1930 bis 1970 Abel was Kantor and organist at the Immanuelkirche in Berlin-Prenzlauer Berg. From 1959 also Regional Church Music Director for the Eastern Region of the Evangelical Church in Berlin, Brandenburg and Silesian Upper Lusatia and from 1956 Church Music Editor at the Evangelische Verlagsanstalt in East Berlin.

Abel composed several church songs and works for the organ.

He died on a journey in Tettnang, Baden-Württemberg.

Some compositions 

 Angels We Have Heard on High (translation from French) (EG 54,  418)
 Von guten Mächten treu und still umgeben (Melody and movement 1959, texte by Dietrich Bonhoeffer 1944) (EG 65, Gesangbuch der Evangelisch-reformierten Kirchen der deutschsprachigen Schweiz 353, Katholisches Gesangbuch der deutschsprachigen Schweiz 554)
 O Heiland, reiß die Himmel auf; Little Advent cantata for soprano, three-part mixed choir with flute, oboe and organ with cello ad libitum; published by Evangelische Verlagsanstalt in Berlin; 1956
 Sei Lob und Ehr dem höchsten Gut; Cantata for mixed choir, string quartet and organ; published by the Evangelische Verlagsanstalt in Berlin; 1957
 Mein Gott, mein Gott, warum hast du mich verlassen ?; Motet for three-part mixed choir
 Ich hebe meine Augen auf; Texte: Psalm 121, 1-3,8; for four-part mixed choir

References

External links 
 

1905 births
1977 deaths
Musicians from Berlin
20th-century German composers
20th-century hymnwriters
German classical organists